Joshua Richmond (born December 19, 1985) is an American male sport shooter who was, at one time, the world's top ranked double trap shooter. He won the ISSF World Shooting Championships in 2010 and 2014, and also has 12 ISSF World Cup medals in the sport. He was favored to win the men's double trap shooting event at the 2012 Summer Olympics, but placed 16th.

Richmond was born in Sayre, Pennsylvania to Michael and Sandra Richmond. He attended Sullivan County High School and Troy State University and resides in Hillsgrove, Pennsylvania. He has a brother, Justin, wife Scharri, and two sons, Tristan and Beaux. In 2011 he was deployed to Afghanistan and earned the Army Commendation Medal, Afghanistan Campaign Medal, National Defense Service Medal, Global War on Terrorism Service Medal, Army Service Ribbon, U.S. International Distinguished Badge and the Grenade Marksmanship Badge.

With the removal of double trap from the Olympics, Josh has transitioned into shooting international trap.

Performance History

Double Trap

References

External links

 

1985 births
Living people
American male sport shooters
Medalists at the 2007 Pan American Games
Olympic shooters of the United States
Pan American Games gold medalists for the United States
Pan American Games medalists in shooting
Shooters at the 2007 Pan American Games
Shooters at the 2012 Summer Olympics
Shooters at the 2016 Summer Olympics
Sportspeople from Pennsylvania
Trap and double trap shooters
United States Distinguished Marksman